Performance science is the multidisciplinary study of human performance. It draws together methodologies across numerous scientific disciplines, including those of biomechanics, economics, physiology, psychology, and sociology, to understand the fundamental skills, mechanisms, and outcomes of performance activities and experiences. It carries implications for various domains of skilled human activity, often performed under extreme stress and/or under the scrutiny of audiences or evaluators. These include performances across the arts, sport,  education, and business, particularly those occupations involving the delivery of highly trained skills such as in surgery and management.

Centers of research and teaching

USC Performance Science Institute, University of Southern California
711th Human Performance Wing, Wright-Patterson Air Force Base
Centre for Human Performance Sciences, Stellenbosch University
Centre for Performance Science, a partnership of the Royal College of Music and Imperial College London
Human Performance Science Research Group, University of Edinburgh
Performance and Science Working Group, Theatre and Performance Research Association
Performance Science Unit, Sports Institute for Northern Ireland

See also
 Environmental psychology
 Industrial and organizational psychology
 Military psychology
 Music psychology
 Sport psychology

References

External links 
International Symposium on Performance Science
Frontiers in Psychology: Performance Science (journal)

Applied sciences
Social sciences